is a prefecture of Japan located in the Chūgoku region of Honshu. Hiroshima Prefecture has a population of 2,811,410 (1 June 2019) and has a geographic area of 8,479 km² (3,274 sq mi). Hiroshima Prefecture borders Okayama Prefecture to the east, Tottori Prefecture to the northeast, Shimane Prefecture to the north, and Yamaguchi Prefecture to the southwest.

Hiroshima is the capital and largest city of Hiroshima Prefecture, and the largest city in the Chūgoku region, with other major cities including Fukuyama, Kure, and Higashihiroshima. Hiroshima Prefecture is located on the Seto Inland Sea across from the island of Shikoku, and is bounded to the north by the Chūgoku Mountains. Hiroshima Prefecture is one of the three prefectures of Japan with more than one UNESCO World Heritage Site.

History 

The area around Hiroshima was formerly divided into Bingo Province and Aki Province. This location has been a center of trade and culture since the beginning of Japan's recorded history. Hiroshima is a traditional center of the Chūgoku region and was the seat of the Mōri clan until the Battle of Sekigahara.

Together with Nara and Tokyo, Hiroshima is one of the three prefectures with more than one UNESCO World Heritage Site. The two such sites in Hiroshima Prefecture are:
 The Atomic Dome in Hiroshima, one of the few remnants of prewar Hiroshima following the atomic bombing in 1945;
 The Itsukushima Shrine in Miyajima, famed for filling with water and appearing to "float" during high tide.

Geography 

Hiroshima prefecture lies in the middle of Japan. Most of the prefecture consists of mountains leading towards Shimane Prefecture; and rivers produce rich plains near the coast.

The province faces Shikoku across the Seto Inland Sea. Hiroshima Bay opens on the Inland Sea.  The prefecture also includes many small islands.

The sheltered nature of the Inland Sea makes Hiroshima's climate very mild.

As of 1 April 2014, 4% of the total land area of the prefecture was designated as Natural Parks (the lowest percentage of any prefecture), namely Setonaikai National Park; Hiba-Dōgo-Taishaku and Nishi-Chūgoku Sanchi Quasi-National Parks; and six Prefectural Natural Parks.

Cities

Fourteen cities are located in Hiroshima Prefecture:

Towns 
These are the towns in each district:

Mergers

Economy 
Hiroshima's main industries include automobiles (Mazda is headquartered there) and tourism in two World Heritage Sites: the A-Bomb dome and Itsukushima Shrine.

Components of the economy are primary industry, secondary industry, and tertiary industry, which compose 0.6%, 32.6%, and 66.2% in 2015. There is 0.6% of unclassified production.

Value of production of manufacturing is 10,343 billion yen in 2016, which is the 10th largest in Japan. After 2012, production of manufacturing is continuously increasing in 2015.

Education

University 
Elisabeth University of Music
Fukuyama City University
Fukuyama Heisei University
Fukuyama University
Hijiyama University
Hiroshima Bunka Gakuen University
Hiroshima Bunkyo Women's University
Hiroshima City University
Hiroshima Institute of Technology
Hiroshima Jogakuin University
Hiroshima Kokusai Gakuin University
Hiroshima Shudo University
Hiroshima University of Economics
Hiroshima University
Japan Coast Guard Academy
Onomichi City University
Prefectural University of Hiroshima
Yasuda Women's University

Religion 

Similar to the rest of Japan, most people in the Hiroshima Prefecture are Shinto or Buddhist. in 1996 51.2% of the population was Buddhist, 2 were affiliated with Shinto Sects, 44.8% practiced Folk Shinto, and 2% were Christian.

Transportation

Railway 
JR West
Sanyo Shinkansen
Sanyo Main Line
Kabe Line
Kure Line
Geibi Line
Fukuen Line
Ibara Railway

People movers 
Astram Line
Skyrail Service

Streetcars 

Hiroshima Electric Railway

Roads

Expressways
Chugoku Expressway
Sanyo Expressway
Shimanami Expressway
Hamada Expressway
Onomichi Expressway
Hiroshima Expressway (West Nippon Expressway Company)
Hiroshima Expressway (urban expressway)

National highways
Route 2
Route 31
Route 54
Route 182
Route 183
Route 185
Route 186
Route 191
Route 261
Route 313
Route 314
Route 317
Route 375
Route 432
Route 433
Route 434
Route 486
Route 487
Route 488

Ports 
Kure Port - Ferry route to Edajima, Matsuyama
Hiroshima Port - Ferry route to Miyajima, Edajima, Matsuyama and Beppu, and also International Container hub port
Mihara Port
Onomichi Port
Fukuyama Port - International Container hub port

Airports 
Hiroshima Airport

Sports 

The sports teams listed below are based in Hiroshima.

Football
Sanfrecce Hiroshima (Hiroshima city)

Baseball
Hiroshima Toyo Carp (Hiroshima city)

Volleyball
JT Thunders (Hiroshima city)

Basketball
Hiroshima Dragonflies
Hiroshima Lightning (Defunct)

Cycling
Victoire Hiroshima

Tourism 

 Hiroshima Peace Memorial
 Hiroshima Castle
 Shukkei-en
 Mitaki Temple
 Itsukushima Shrine
 Momijidani Park
 Mount Misen
 Miyajima Public Aquarium
 Senkō-ji Temple
 Jōdo-ji Temple
 Onomichi City Museum of Art
 Fukuyama Castle

Famous festivals and events
 Onomichi Port Festival - held in April
 Hiroshima Flower Festival - held from May 3 to 5
 Fukuyama Rose Festival - held in May
 Enryuji Tokasan Festival - held in June
 Gion Festival of Onomichi - held in July
 Innoshima Water-naval Festival - held in August
 Miyajima Under-water Firework Festival - held on August 14 
 Yassa Festival of Mihara - held in August
 Saijo Sake Festival - held in October
 Onomichi Becher Festival - held on November 3
 Hiroshima Ebisu Festival - held from November 18 to 20

International sister relations
  Sichuan Province, China
  Hawaii, United States of America

Notes

References
 Nussbaum, Louis-Frédéric and Käthe Roth. (2005).  Japan encyclopedia. Cambridge: Harvard University Press. ; OCLC 58053128

External links 

 Official Hiroshima Prefecture homepage
 Life in Hiroshima and other Japan-related Articles
 Hiroshima Weather Forecast
 National Archives of Japan  ... Hiroshima map (1891)
 National Archives of Japan:  Itsukushima kakei, illustrated scroll describing Itsukushima, text by Kaibara Ekiken (circa 1720)
 hiroshima-navi

 
Chūgoku region
Prefectures of Japan